In sports, possession is physical control of the ball or other implement of play by one team, which typically gives that team the opportunity to score. Sports have different rules governing how possession is kept or lost ("turned over"), which affect the strategy of gameplay. The number of possessions or total time of possession are often useful statistics of team or individual performance.

In goal-based sports, including basketball, all forms of football, hockey, and lacrosse, the team with possession has the opportunity to score, and is said to be on offense, while the other team is on defense. In bat-and-ball games including baseball and cricket, the ball is controlled by the fielding team, which is on defense.

Determining possession

Start of gameplay
Possession at the start of a game, or in a neutral restart, may be determined by several methods, including a coin flip (American football and cricket), home team status (baseball), or by giving the teams an equal opportunity to physically take possession, by means such as a dropped-ball (association football), a ball-up (Australian rules football), a jump ball (basketball), or a face-off (hockey).

Scoring or losing control
In several sports, possession is exchanged after the offensive team scores, or when the defensive team physically takes control of a "live" (in play) ball through a fumble, interception, steal, or penalty such as a free kick to the defensive side. In bat-and-ball sports, this can occur after the end of one of the batting (offensive) team's scoring turns, which can be brought about by the defense preventing a certain number of offensive players from scoring (each of these offensive players must be gotten "out" by various rules in each game).

Allotted number of plays
In gridiron football, possession is additionally controlled through a series of allotted plays called downs, during which the offensive team must move the ball a certain distance down the field, or lose possession. Similarly, in rugby league, offensive teams have six chances to score, or tackles, before losing possession. In limited overs cricket, the defense has a limited number of legal deliveries, which are periods of play, in each of which a defensive player throws the ball (according to certain rules) for an offensive player to hit and attempt to help his team score off of, before the offense's scoring turn ends and the defense must surrender possession of the ball.

Shot clocks
In some timed sports, a team with possession and a lead in score may try to "run time off the clock" by keeping the ball but not attempting to score, in order to deny the opposing team possession. A shot clock speeds gameplay by requiring teams to attempt to score within a certain period of time or lose possession.

Turnovers by sport
Turnovers in different sports include:
Turnover (basketball), resulting from a steal, or a player going out of bounds, committing a violation (including exceeding the shot clock), or committing an offensive foul
Turnover (gridiron football), in American and Canadian football, when the offense loses possession of the football because of a fumble, interception, or on downs
Turnover (rugby league), when a team loses possession or at the end of a team's six tackles
Turnover (rugby union), when a team loses possession in a ruck or a maul

Calculation and statistical use
In association football, several methods have been used to measure teams' possession percentage, including both clock time and proportion of passes by a team. It has historically been assumed that a greater possession percentage correlates with a scoring advantage, however, at least one study has questioned this assumption.

References

Terminology used in multiple sports
Sports rules and regulations
Scoring (sport)
Broad-concept articles